New Times was an intellectual movement among leftists in Great Britain in the late 1980s. It was centred on the Eurocommunist faction of the Communist Party of Great Britain (CPGB), and most of the intellectual groundwork for the movement was laid out in the latter party's official theoretical journal, Marxism Today.

History

Background 
After the Soviet invasions of Hungary in 1956, and especially Czechoslovakia in 1968, many western Communists began to question their allegiance to the Soviet Union.  Some disillusioned communists  swung to the left and joined Trotskyist parties.  Others, led by Enrico Berlinguer's Italian Communist Party (PCI), stayed within the Communist Parties and developed their own critique.  This would essentially lead to an expanded version of the "popular front" policies of the 1930s, with a number of CPs attempting to ingratiate themselves to the existing political establishment.  The movement came to be known as Eurocommunism.

Eurocommunism in Britain 
Whereas Eurocommunist factions in the French and Italian communist parties fairly successfully managed to impose their agenda on the party platforms, things were not so simple in other countries.  In Britain, particularly, there were bitter struggles from the 1970s on.  The party became divided into 'Euros' and 'tankies' (so called for their support of Soviet interventions in Eastern Bloc countries).

A major coup for the Euros was obtaining control over Marxism Today.  Martin Jacques became editor in 1977, and began to publish articles mostly by prominent Eurocommunists.  More recently, he cites Eric Hobsbawm's 1978 article "Forward March Of Labour Halted?"  as a turning point. In the early 80s, the New Times idea began to emerge.  Alongside Jacques, Stuart Hall was highly influential.  Articles were published in MT questioning the Left's opposition to consumerism, focus on material production and the industrial working class, and approach to Margaret Thatcher. The term "Thatcherism" is largely attributable to Hall's work in MT, where he argued that she was not 'just another' Tory.

In 1988, New Times was belatedly named in MT's October issue.  A special edition proclaimed that "Mass production, the mass consumer, the big city, big-brother state, the sprawling housing estate, and the nation-state are in decline: flexibility, diversity, differentiation, mobility, communication, decentralisation and internationalisation are in the ascendant. In the process our own identities, our sense of self, our own subjectivities are being transformed. We are in transition to a new era." The movement had now reached its peak, with a huge influence on Neil Kinnock and later Tony Blair's reorientation of the Labour Party.

Theory 
The principal basis of New Times is, as the name suggests, the idea that the 1980s and 90s represent a significant break with previous history.  The transition from Fordism to Post-fordism is a key factor, as workers in western nations are no longer concentrated in large workplaces, but employed widely in the service and public sectors; blue collar jobs are replaced by white collar ones; and consumption is democratised to a far greater extent than previously.

Other things are seen as radically new. Thatcherism, for example, is seen not as a simple development of previous Tory policy, but as a radical departure.  Jacques, in the introduction to the MT special, writes that "at the heart of Thatcherism, has been its sense of New Times, of living in a new era... the Right has glimpsed the future and run with it." The new times require new politics, and Thatcher is the first one to realise it.

In terms of concrete political positions, the NT milieu did not significantly differ from the wider Eurocommunist scene.  NT did not see their role as informing Communist cadre so much as influencing the wider left, in particular the Labourites and Liberals.  They advocated broad coalitions of oppressed groups, and ushered in an era of 'identity politics'. (Indeed, much of Hall's subsequent work was concerned with questions of identity.) NT repudiated the project of abolishing capitalism, ascribing the failure of Bolshevism to 'voluntarism.' NT held instead to a decidedly reformist project: the left should adapt to the world, rather than seeking to change it.

During the Marxism Today discussion, A Sivanandan published a critique in Race & Class in which he argued that class struggle was still central to capitalism. It begins:

"New Times is a fraud, a counterfeit, a humbug. It palms off Thatcherite values as socialist, shores up the Thatcherite market with the pretended politics of choice, fits out the Thatcherite individual with progressive consumerism, makes consumption itself the stuff of politics."

Legacy 
Many New Times intellectuals were instrumental in reorganising the Labour Party. Hobsbawm was an advisor to Neil Kinnock, as Martin Kettle later was to Tony Blair.  Many of Blair's inner circle were former Communists of the Euro/NT school. Those intellectuals who still identify with the New Times school are often very critical of Blair's alleged over-identification with Thatcherite policy.

The Democratic Left movement set up by MT alumni in the 1990s published a magazine also called New Times. This ceased publication in 2000.

See also
British left

References

Communist Party of Great Britain
Marxist theory
Organizations established in 1977
Defunct political organisations based in the United Kingdom